Hamidou Sinayoko (born 11 March 1986 in Ségou) is a Malian professional footballer, who plays for Djoliba AC.

Career 
The Forward started his career with Union Sportive Bougouni in his hometown, before moved 2011 to Onze Créateurs de Niaréla. He played for Onze Createurs until 2013 and signed than for Djoliba AC in summer 2013.

International career
In January 2014, coach Djibril Dramé, invited him to be a part of the Mali squad for the 2014 African Nations Championship. He helped the team to the quarter finals where they lost to Zimbabwe by two goals to one. He played three games for Mali national football team.

International goals
Scores and results list Mali's goal tally first.

References

Living people
Mali international footballers
Malian footballers
Mali A' international footballers
2014 African Nations Championship players
1986 births
People from Ségou
AS Onze Créateurs de Niaréla players
Association football forwards
21st-century Malian people
Malian expatriate footballers
Malian expatriate sportspeople in Malaysia
Expatriate footballers in Malaysia
2016 African Nations Championship players
Djoliba AC players
2022 African Nations Championship players